Ellen Young may refer to:

Ellen Young (poet) (1810–1872), Australian poet, feminist, fighting for the rights of women and bringing attention to the lifestyle via poems 
Ellen Young (politician) (born 1952), American politician, representative in the New York State Assembly

See also
Martha Ellen Young Truman (1852–1947), the mother of U.S. president Harry Truman